Khandelwal is a surname used in India. It originated in Rajasthan, India from Khandela. Belong to Rajasthan, Gujarat, Uttar Pradesh, Delhi. Notable people with the surname include:

 Anil Khandelwal (born 1948), Indian business executive
 Gulab Khandelwal (1924–2017), Indian poet
 Hemant Khandelwal (born 1964), Indian politician
 Purshottam Khandelwal, Indian politician
 Pyarelal Khandelwal (1925–2009), Indian politician
 Rajeev Khandelwal (born 1975), Indian actor
 Rohit Khandelwal (born 1989), Indian model, actor and television personality
 Varun Khandelwal, Indian television actor
 Vijay Kumar Khandelwal (1936–2007), Indian politician
 Apoorva A Khandelwal (born 1996), Indian Financial Analyst

Indian surnames
Toponymic surnames
People from Sikar district
Surnames of Hindustani origin
Hindu surnames
Surnames of Indian origin